Hopang District is a district of Shan State, Burma. It is part of the Wa Self-Administered Division. It was set up in 2011 and consists of three townships, Hopang, Mongmai and Pangwan, and two subtownships, Namtit and Panlong.

History
At  Hopang District also included Matman, Namphan and Pangsang townships, which formed to become Matman District.

References

2011 establishments in Myanmar
Districts of Myanmar
Geography of Shan State